Nelnet, Inc., is a United States-based conglomerate that deals in the administration and repayment of student loans and education financial services. The company is headquartered in Lincoln, Nebraska.

The company provides a range of products through its subsidiaries, which includes customer service for student loan borrowers, technology related to student loan customer service, outsourcing services for guaranty agencies, tuition payment plans, education planning, enrollment-related services and higher education planning tools.

On February 7, 2018, Nelnet completed its acquisition of Great Lakes Educational Loan Services, Inc. The combined company is the largest servicer of student loans in the United States, with $397 billion in loans, or around 42% of all student loans in the United States.

History
Nelnet was founded in 1996 by Mike Dunlap and Steve Butterfield. In March 2000, Nelnet bought UNIPAC Service Corporation, an existing loan servicing company which was founded in 1978 and based in Denver, Colorado. As a subsidiary, UNIPAC Service Corporation was then renamed Nelnet Loan Services, Inc. In June 2000, Nelnet acquired In Tuition, Inc. a loan servicing company based in Jacksonville, Florida which was founded in 1979.

Nelnet became a publicly traded company in 2003, at which point the two founders were co-CEOs. In August 2003, the parent company was renamed from Nelnet Loan Services, Inc. to simply Nelnet, Inc. The Initial public offering occurred on August 19, 2003, for $200 million. Steve Butterfield stepped down as CEO in 2007.

Nelnet owns over 50 subsidiaries that administer and collect student loans throughout the United States and Canada, such as inTuition, infiNET, LoanSTAR, and TriCura Canada, Inc. Also through their subsidy, FACTS Management they own Ren Web, a school management program.

One of their lobbyists is Clark Lytle Geduldig & Cranford.

Lines of business

Nelnet Diversified Services (NDS)
Provides customer service for student loan borrowers, technology related to student loan customer service, and outsourcing services for guaranty agencies.

One of the main NDS lines of business is Proxy, a business process outsourcing company based in Lincoln, Nebraska and Aurora, Colorado.

NDS companies also include Nelnet Loan Servicing, Great Lakes Educational Loan Services, Inc., First mark Services, Grant Pro, Responsible Repay, and Campus Guard.

Nelnet Enrollment Services (NES)
Provides education planning and enrollment-related services that give parents, students, and schools access to online educational resources and higher education planning tools.

Through NES, students can search for colleges and graduate schools, learn about admissions, find scholarships, prepare for tests, and more. In addition, NES helps colleges and universities recruit prospective students with interactive marketing strategies, enabling them to reach their enrollment goals.

NES includes Peterson's Interactive, Peterson's Publishing, EssayEdge, and Government Services.

NES used to include Spark room until January 31, 2016. As of February 1, 2016, Digital Media Solutions, DMS, bought Spark room from Nelnet.

Nelnet Business Services (NBS)
Provides tuition payment plans, donor services, and financial aid services to families with students attending private and faith-based K-12 schools, as well as for colleges and universities.

NBS includes FACTS Management, Nelnet Business Solutions, and Payment Spring (PS).

FACTS Management
FACTS Management bought out Ren Web in June 2014. Ren Web is a provider of an online school management program, which is mostly used in the private school market at over 3500 schools.

Other subsidiaries

Resume Edge, which includes Resume Builder, offers professional resume writing, tools, and resources.

Total Well-Being provides services that motivate organizations’ employees to achieve health & wellness goals.

Total Well-Being Strive is an online fitness and wellness tracker created in-house at Nelnet and launched in early 2014. With the ability to be tailored to customer's needs, Total Well-Being Strive tracks nutrition and fitness while providing challenges to encourage employees to adopt a lifestyle of wellness.

Health Education Solutions, an expert online certification course provider in the health education field, offers advanced cardiac life support (ACLS) and pediatric advanced life support (PALS) training and certification according to the latest American Heart Association guidelines.

Allo Communications, a fiber optic cable and internet service provider headquartered in Imperial, Nebraska.

Nelnet also invests in a number of startup companies, including Hudl, Nebraska Global, Eye Verify, Travefy, and Mind Mixer.

Controversies

In February 2007, New York Attorney General Andrew Cuomo launched an investigation into alleged deceptive lending practices by student loan providers, including The College Board, EduCap, Nelnet, Citibank, and Sallie Mae.

The New York Times reported in August 2007 that Jon Bruning, Nebraska Attorney General, allowed Nelnet to be forgiven the $1 million settlement the company reached with Bruning in April 2007. Nelnet was accused of industry wide kickbacks, improper inducements, and gifts from student loan providers to colleges and universities. Nelnet agreed to provide $1 million to the state in support of a national financial aid awareness campaign. Bruning decided in August 2007 to forgive Nelnet its $1 million obligation after the company announced that it had reached a separate $2 million settlement with New York State Attorney General Andrew Cuomo.

Nelnet has also made significant financial contributions to United States congressional campaigns, including a contribution from Nelnet and Union Bank & Trust Company of $16,100 to Jon Bruning, Nebraska Attorney General, for his Senate election campaign. Nelnet spent approximately $200,000.00 in the 2015-2016 Election Cycle, per Federal Election Commission Records and have already spent an approximate $60,000 for the 2017-2018 Election Cycle.

A United States Department of Education audit revealed that from 1993 to 2007, Nelnet had utilized a loophole in federal tax legislation that allowed the company to receive a higher interest rate on specified loans, generating $278 million from taxpayers. Nelnet disputed the findings of the audit through a letter written to the United States Department of Education letting them know of this loophole, and ultimately, U.S. Department of Education ruled that Nelnet would keep the $278 million.

The Chronicle of Higher Education reported in August 2010, that Nelnet settled a case for $55 million. The suit was filed by a former Department of Education researcher named Dr. Jon Oberg. Nelnet and other lenders were accused of defrauding taxpayers of billions of dollars in student loan subsidies. The largest student lender in the country, Sallie Mae, is also listed as a defendant in the case. Oberg's suit ultimately led to taxpayer funds being returned by seven of the nine companies Oberg sued.

References

External links

 Nelnet recipient profile on USAspending.gov
 Contract ED-FSA-09-D-0013 on USAspending.gov
 Contract ED-FSA-09-D-0012 on USAspending.gov
Nelnet letters to the Letter to Nebraska Attorney General
Allo Communications Website
PaymentSpring, a Nelnet company

Companies listed on the New York Stock Exchange
United States federal student loan servicers
Companies based in Lincoln, Nebraska
1996 establishments in Nebraska
Education finance in the United States